The 2019 FC Kairat season was the 9th successive season that the club playing in the Kazakhstan Premier League, the highest tier of association football in Kazakhstan, since their promotion back to the top flight in 2009. Kairat finished the season in 2nd place, 1 point behind champions Astana, reached the Second Qualifying Round of the Europa League, where runners-up in the Kazakhstan Super Cup were knocked out of the Kazakhstan Cup at the Quarterfinal stage.

Season events
On 25 November 2018, Kairat presented Aleksey Shpilevsky as their new manager.

Following the conclusion of the season, on 14 November, Aderinsola Eseola signed a new two-year contract with Kairat, whilst Sergey Keyler extended his contract for another two season with the option of an additional third season. On 25 November, Kairat announced that both Aybol Abiken and Stas Pokatilov had both signed new three-year contracts with the club.

Squad

Out on loan

Transfers

In

Out

Loans out

Released

Trial

Friendlies

Competitions

Super Cup

Premier League

Results summary

Results by round

Results

League table

Kazakhstan Cup

UEFA Europa League

Qualifying rounds

Squad statistics

Appearances and goals

|-
|colspan="14"|Players away from Kairat on loan:

|-
|colspan="14"|Players who left Kairat during the season:

|}

Goal scorers

Disciplinary record

Notes

References

External links
Official Website

FC Kairat seasons
Kairat
Kairat